Faggeto Lario is a comune (municipality) in the Province of Como in the Italian region of Lombardy, located about  north of Milan and about  northeast of Como.

Faggeto Lario borders the following municipalities: Albavilla, Albese con Cassano, Caglio, Carate Urio, Caslino d'Erba, Erba, Laglio, Nesso, Pognana Lario, Tavernerio, Torno.

References

Cities and towns in Lombardy